Aeromaan SA de CV is a Mexican airline based in San Luis Potosí, San Luis Potosí. Currently, Aeromaan operates charter, cargo, taxi and executive flights, as well as repairs and ACMI.

History
The airline was established in 2002 by a group of investors and began operations that June. Aeromaan was under the direction of 2695731 Canada Inc., a Canadian group of general aviation, until March 2008, when the group went out of business due to the economic state. Aeromaan investments was transferred to K7 Investments SA de CV.

Fleet

 2 Hawker 800 XP
 Agusta 109
 Bell 407
 Diamond DA62
 Diamond DA42MPP
 Robinson R66

Former fleet
 Beechcraft 95
 Beechcraft Bonanza M35
 Beechcraft Bonanza V35
 Cessna 310
 Cessna Citation Bravo

References

External links
 Official website

Airlines of San Luis Potosi
Charter airlines of Mexico
Airlines established in 2002
Airlines of Mexico
Mexican companies established in 2002